Between Waves may refer to:

 Between Waves (album), 2009 album by David Fonseca
 Between Waves (film), 2020 Canadian film
 Between Waves, 2016 album by The Album Leaf